Georgia participated in the Eurovision Song Contest 2017 with the song "Keep the Faith" written by Anri Jokhadze and Tamara Gachechiladze. The song was performed by Tamara Gachechiladze, who was due to represent Georgia in the Eurovision Song Contest 2009 as part of Stephane and 3G with the song "We Don't Wanna Put In" before the nation's withdrawal in protest of the Russo-Georgian War. Songwriter Anri Jokhadze represented Georgia in the 2012 contest where he failed to qualify to the final with the song "I'm a Joker". The Georgian broadcaster Georgian Public Broadcaster (GPB) held a national final in order to select the Georgian entry for the 2017 contest in Kyiv, Ukraine. An open call for submissions was held which resulted in the submission of twenty-five entries that were presented to the public during a televised production on 20 January 2017. The results of a public televote combined with the votes of an international jury resulted in the selection of "Keep the Faith" performed by Tamara Gachechiladze as the Georgian entry.

Georgia was drawn to compete in the first semi-final of the Eurovision Song Contest which took place on 9 May 2017. Performing during the show in position 2, "Keep the Faith" was not announced among the top 10 entries of the second semi-final and therefore did not qualify to compete in the final. It was later revealed that Georgia placed eleventh out of the 18 participating countries in the semi-final with 99 points.

Background

Prior to the 2017 contest, Georgia had participated in the Eurovision Song Contest nine times since their first entry in 2007. The nation's highest placing in the contest, to this point, has been ninth place, which was achieved on two occasions: in 2010 with the song "Shine" performed by Sofia Nizharadze and in 2011 with the song "One More Day" performed by Eldrine. The nation briefly withdrew from the contest in 2009 after the European Broadcasting Union (EBU) rejected the Georgian entry, "We Don't Wanna Put In", for perceived political references to Vladimir Putin who was the Russian Prime Minister at the time. The withdrawal and fallout was tied to tense relations between Georgia and then host country Russia, which stemmed from the 2008 Russo-Georgian War. Following the introduction of semi-finals, Georgia has, to this point, failed to qualify to the final on only two occasions. In , Georgia qualified to the final where the country placed 20th with the song "Midnight Gold" performed by Nika Kocharov and Young Georgian Lolitaz.

The Georgian national broadcaster, Georgian Public Broadcaster (GPB), broadcasts the event within Georgia and organises the selection process for the nation's entry. GPB confirmed their intentions to participate at the 2017 Eurovision Song Contest on 3 October 2016. Georgia has selected their entry for the Eurovision Song Contest both through national finals and internal selections in the past. In 2016, GPB opted to internally select the Georgian artist while the song was chosen in a national final. For their 2017 participation, both the artist and song was selected via a national final.

Before Eurovision

Evroviizis erovnul konkurss 
GPB opened a public submission from 7 November 2016 until 7 December 2016. 28 entries were received by the submission deadline, of which three were later withdrawn. The twenty-five entries were presented to the public via a special programme on 20 January 2017 at the Philharmonic Hall in Tbilisi, hosted by 2013 Georgian Eurovision entrant Nodiko Tatishvili and Liza Tsiklauri and broadcast on the GPB First Channel as well as online at the broadcaster's website 1tv.ge. The winner, "Keep the Faith" performed by Tako Gachechiladze, was determined upon by the combination of the votes of an international jury (80%) and a public televote (20%). The international jury consisted of Tali Eshkoli (television director), Ralf Reinink (journalist), Sacha Jean-Baptiste (staging director) and Borislav Milanov (composer and producer).

Promotion
Tamara Gachechiladze made several appearances across Europe to specifically promote "Keep the Faith" as the Georgian Eurovision entry. On 4 February, Tamara Gachechiladze performed "Keep the Faith" during the first semi-final of the Ukrainian Eurovision national final. Between 3 and 6 April, Gachechiladze took part in promotional activities in Tel Aviv, Israel where she performed during the Israel Calling event held at the Ha'teatron venue. On 8 April, she performed during the Eurovision in Concert event which was held at the Melkweg venue in Amsterdam, Netherlands and hosted by Cornald Maas and Selma Björnsdóttir. On 15 April, Tamara Gachechiladze performed during the Eurovision Spain Pre-Party, which was held at the Sala La Riviera venue in Madrid, Spain.

At Eurovision 

According to Eurovision rules, all nations with the exceptions of the host country and the "Big Five" (France, Germany, Italy, Spain and the United Kingdom) are required to qualify from one of two semi-finals in order to compete for the final; the top ten countries from each semi-final progress to the final. The European Broadcasting Union (EBU) split up the competing countries into six different pots based on voting patterns from previous contests, with countries with favourable voting histories put into the same pot. On 31 January 2017, a special allocation draw was held which placed each country into one of the two semi-finals, as well as which half of the show they would perform in. Georgia was placed into the first semi-final, to be held on 9 May 2017, and was scheduled to perform in the first half of the show.

Once all the competing songs for the 2017 contest had been released, the running order for the semi-finals was decided by the shows' producers rather than through another draw, so that similar songs were not placed next to each other. Georgia was set to perform in position 2, following the entry from Sweden and before the entry from Australia.

The two semi-finals and the final were broadcast in Georgia on GPB First Channel with commentary by Demetre Ergemlidze. The Georgian spokesperson, who announced the top 12-point score awarded by the Georgian jury during the final, was 2016 Georgian Eurovision entrant Nika Kocharov.

Semi-final

amara Gachechiladze took part in technical rehearsals on 30 April and 4 May, followed by dress rehearsals on 8 and 9 May. This included the jury show on 8 May where the professional juries of each country watched and voted on the competing entries.

The Georgian performance featured Tamara Gachechiladze in a full-length red dress with a cape, the latter which she later ripped off. The stage colours were red, white and black with the LED screen displaying a space theme. The performance also featured pyrotechnic flame effects. The staging director for the Georgian performance was Sacha Jean-Baptiste. Tamara Gachechiladze was joined by five off-stage backing vocalists: Giorgi Tskhvariashvili, Guri Pasikashvili, Mariam Akobia, Mariam Jomardidze and Natia Oqruashvili.

At the end of the show, Georgia was not announced among the top 10 entries in the first semi-final and therefore failed to qualify to compete in the final. It was later revealed that Georgia placed eleventh in the semi-final, receiving a total of 99 points: 37 points from the televoting and 62 points from the juries.

Voting
Voting during the three shows involved each country awarding two sets of points from 1-8, 10 and 12: one from their professional jury and the other from televoting. Each nation's jury consisted of five music industry professionals who are citizens of the country they represent, with their names published before the contest to ensure transparency. This jury judged each entry based on: vocal capacity; the stage performance; the song's composition and originality; and the overall impression by the act. In addition, no member of a national jury was permitted to be related in any way to any of the competing acts in such a way that they cannot vote impartially and independently. The individual rankings of each jury member as well as the nation's televoting results were released shortly after the grand final.

Below is a breakdown of points awarded to Georgia and awarded by Georgia in the first semi-final and grand final of the contest, and the breakdown of the jury voting and televoting conducted during the two shows:

Points awarded to Georgia

Points awarded by Georgia

Detailed voting results
The following members comprised the Georgian jury:
 Maia Baratashvili (jury chairperson)singer, musician
 Medea Kavtaradzevocal coach
 Mirian Kukulashvilimusical producer
 Gvantsa KilasoniaTV producer
 Mamuka Begashvilicomposer, sound engineer

References

External links

 

2017
Countries in the Eurovision Song Contest 2017
Eurovision